Temora Shire is a local government area in the Riverina region of New South Wales, Australia.  It is on Burley Griffin Way. The Shire was created on 1 January 1981 via the amalgamation of Narraburra Shire and the Municipality of Temora.

It includes the town of Temora and the small towns of Springdale, Sebastapol, Ariah Park, Gidginbung, Narraburra and Wallundry.

The mayor of Temora Shire is Cr. Rick Firman.

Heritage listings
The Temora Shire has a number of heritage-listed sites, including:
 Temora, Cootamundra-Griffith railway: Temora railway station

Council

Current composition and election method
Temora Shire Council is composed of nine councillors elected proportionally as a single ward. All councillors are elected for a fixed four-year term of office. The mayor is elected by the councillors at the first meeting of the council. The most recent election was held on 10 September 2016 and the makeup of the council is as follows:

The current Council, elected in 2016, in order of election, is:

References 

 
Local government areas of the Riverina
Local government areas of New South Wales
1981 establishments in Australia